Violin Concerto No. 4 may refer to:

 Violin Concerto No. 4 (Haydn) in G major
 Violin Concerto No. 4 (Mozart) in D major
 Violin Concerto No. 4 (Paganini) in D minor
 Violin Concerto No. 4 (Schnittke)
 Violin Concerto No. 4 (Vieuxtemps) in D minor, a composition by Henri Vieuxtemps

See also 
List of compositions for violin and orchestra
Violin Concerto